The British Academy Video Games Award for Game Design is an award presented annually by the British Academy of Film and Television Arts (BAFTA). It is given in honor of "the best game design that captivates and engages the player", including recognition of elements such as game mechanics, use of controls, level and world structure, and pacing. 

The award was first given at the 8th British Academy Video Games Awards ceremony, held in 2012, to the Valve title Portal 2. Since its inception, the award has been given to eleven games and, to date, no developer has won the award more than once. Nintendo EPD and Ubisoft Montreal hold the record for most nominations among developers, with four each, though the former won in 2017, leaving the latter as the developer with most nominations without a win. Sony Interactive Entertainment lead the publishing nominees, with fifteen nominations and two wins, while Ubisoft are the publisher with the most nominations without a win, with five. 

The current holder of the award is Inscryption by Daniel Mullins Games and Devolver Digital, which won at the 18th British Academy Games Awards in 2022.

Winners and nominees
In the following table, the years are listed as per BAFTA convention, and generally correspond to the year of game release in the United Kingdom.

Multiple nominations and wins

Developers

Publishers

References

External links
British Academy Video Games Awards official website

Design